Eustala anastera, the humpbacked orbweaver, is a species of orb weaver in the family Araneidae. It is found in North and Central America.

Description 

Females of this species grow to 10mm, males growing to 9.5mm. The coloration of the prosoma is quite variable in color, though it usually matches that of the opisthosoma. The coloration can vary from tones of tan, to vivid green. Some have a dark line along the median, as the one pictured, and many have a foliate pattern. The legs are also quite variable, and are covered in short spines, which are most notable in males.

Subspecies
 Eustala anastera anastera (Walckenaer, 1841)
 Eustala anastera vermiformis Franganillo, 1931

References

 Bradley, Richard A. (2012). Common Spiders of North America. University of California Press.
 Breene, R. G., D. Allen Dean, G. B. Edwards, Blain Hebert, Herbert W. Levi, Gail Manning, et al. (2003). Common Names of Arachnids, Fifth Edition, 42.
 Ubick, Darrell (2005). Spiders of North America: An Identification Manual. American Arachnological Society.

Araneidae
Spiders described in 1841